"The Dark Side of the Earth" was an American television play broadcast live on September 19, 1957, as part of the CBS television series, Playhouse 90. It was the second episode of the second season. Rod Serling's teleplay told the story of a band of Hungarian freedom fighters captured by the Soviets in 1956.

Plot
The play tells the story of Russia's suppression of the Hungarian Revolution of 1956.

Cast
 Van Heflin as Col. Sten, a Red Army officer charged with suppressing revolution
 Earl Holliman as Capt. Volodney, Sten's uncompromising subordinate
 Dean Jagger as Anton Rojas, a Hungarian communist collaborator
 Kim Hunter as Anna Rojas, wife of the collaborator
 Jerry Paris as Chevak
 Ian Wolfe as General Kerch

Production
Martin Manulis was the producer and Arthur Penn the director.  Rod Serling wrote the teleplay. It was the first live television appearance for both Van Heflin and Dean Jagger.

Reception
The television critic in The Philadelphia Inquirer  praised the "literate script", the "talented cast", Arthur Penn's restrained direction, and believable if not admirable characters.

Arthur Grace in The Miami News called it "a beautifully written dramatic play" and "a timeless play, appropriate at any time and any place when, in war or revolution, men must slaughter each other." He also praised the superb character development and superb performances of Jagger, Van Heflin, and Hunter.

References

1957 American television episodes
Playhouse 90 (season 2) episodes
1957 television plays